Head First is a Canadian documentary film, directed by Mathieu Arsenault and released in 2019. Inspired by Arsenault's own diagnosis with bipolar disorder in the mid-2010s, the film profiles his experiences and those of two other people living with the disease, photographer Frédérique Ménard-Aubin and former musician Louis Parizeau, both to educate viewers about mental health and to portray their efforts to avoid allowing their lives to be consumed or controlled by the condition.

The film premiered on February 28, 2019 at the Rendez-vous Québec Cinéma.

Arsenault received a Canadian Screen Award nomination for Best Cinematography in a Documentary at the 8th Canadian Screen Awards in 2020.

References

External links
 

2019 films
2019 documentary films
Canadian documentary films
Quebec films
Films shot in Quebec
Documentary films about mental disorders
French-language Canadian films
2010s Canadian films
2010s French-language films